Y-320 is an orally active immunomodulator, and inhibits IL-17 production by CD4 T cells stimulated with IL-15 with IC50 of 20 to 60 nM.

Biological activity

In vitro
Y-320 also inhibits the production of IFN-γ and TNF-α by mouse CD4 T cells stimulated with IL-15, CXCL12, and anti-CD3 mAb.

In vivo
Y-320 (0.3-3 mg/kg p.o.) ameliorates collagen-induced arthritis (CIA) in Mice with a reduction of IL-17 mRNA in arthritic joints, and also shows therapeutic effects on CIA in cynomolgus monkeys. Moreover, Y-320 shows a synergistic effect in combination with anti-TNF-α mAb on chronic-progressing CIA in mice.

References

Ketones
Nitriles
Chloroarenes
Pyrazoles